This is the list of awards and nominations received by Armin van Buuren, whose career in electronic music both as a DJ, record producer and remixer has spanned over 20 years.

Amongst his major competitive achievements, van Buuren has won twelve DJ Awards, twenty seven International Dance Music Award's, and five DJ Mag Award's. Overall in his career, to date, he has won 50 competitive awards from 91 nominations.

DJ Awards

DJ Magazine Top 100 DJ

International Dance Music Awards

Pre-2016

2018-Present
No award ceremony was held in 2017. In 2018 winners were chosen by the Winter Music Conference themselves. 2019 marks the first year of public voting since the Winter Music Conference's restructure.

International Golden Gnome Awards

Grammy Awards

NRJ Music Awards

Trancepodium Global Awards

Trancepodium DJ Top 50/100
Top 50 till 2013, Top 100 since 2014.

World Music Awards

YouTube Creator Awards
Armin van Buuren  (4.4 million subscribers - May 2020)
A State Of Trance (656 thousand subscribers - May 2020)

Other awards

References

van Buuren
Awards